Felt's Farm, also known as Carter's Farm & Mill, is a historic home located at Union Township, Delaware County, Indiana. The main house was built about 1830, and is a two-story, Federal style brick I-house. It has a fieldstone foundation, gable roof, and one-story rear wing.

It was added to the National Register of Historic Places in 1975.

References

Houses on the National Register of Historic Places in Indiana
Federal architecture in Indiana
Houses completed in 1830
Houses in Delaware County, Indiana
National Register of Historic Places in Delaware County, Indiana